Joseph Leonard Gordon-Levitt (born February 17, 1981) is an American actor. He has received various accolades, including nominations for the Golden Globe Award for Best Actor – Motion Picture Musical or Comedy for his leading performances in 500 Days of Summer (2009) and 50/50 (2011). He is the founder of the online media platform HitRecord whose projects such as HitRecord on TV (2014–15) and Create Together (2020) won him two Primetime Emmy Awards in the category of Outstanding Interactive Program.

Born in Los Angeles to a Jewish family, Gordon-Levitt began his acting career as a child, appearing in the films A River Runs Through It (1992), Holy Matrimony (1994), and Angels in the Outfield (1994), which earned him a Young Artist Award and a Saturn Award nomination. He played the role of Tommy Solomon in the TV series 3rd Rock from the Sun (1996–2001) for which he received three nominations at the Screen Actors Guild Awards. He had a supporting role in 10 Things I Hate About You (1999) and voiced Jim Hawkins in the Disney animated Treasure Planet (2002) before taking a break from acting to study at Columbia University, but dropped out in 2004 to resume his acting career.

Since returning to acting, Gordon-Levitt has starred in Manic (2001), Mysterious Skin (2004), Brick (2005), The Lookout (2007), The Brothers Bloom (2008), Miracle at St. Anna (2008), G.I. Joe: The Rise of Cobra (2009), Inception (2010), Hesher (2010), Premium Rush (2012), The Dark Knight Rises (2012), Looper (2012), and Lincoln (2012). He portrayed Philippe Petit in the Robert Zemeckis-directed film The Walk (2015) and whistleblower Edward Snowden in the Oliver Stone film Snowden (2016). In 2020, he starred in the legal drama The Trial of the Chicago 7, for which he won the Critics' Choice Movie Award for Best Acting Ensemble and the Screen Actors Guild Award for Outstanding Performance by a Cast in a Motion Picture.

In 2013, he wrote and directed Don Jon, a comedy-drama film that was released to positive reviews and earned him an Independent Spirit Award nomination for Best First Screenplay. He previously directed and edited two short films, both of which were released in 2010: Morgan M. Morgansen's Date with Destiny and Morgan and Destiny's Eleventeenth Date: The Zeppelin Zoo. In 2021, he wrote, directed and starred in a comedy drama series Mr. Corman on Apple TV+. In 2022, he voiced Jiminy Cricket in Disney's live-action remake of Pinocchio. He lives in Wellington with his wife and two children.

Early life
Joseph Leonard Gordon-Levitt was born on February 17, 1981, in Los Angeles, California, and was raised in the Sherman Oaks neighborhood. He is Ashkenazi Jewish, from a family that is "not strictly religious" and his parents were among the founders of the Progressive Jewish Alliance. Gordon-Levitt's father, Dennis Levitt, was once the news director for the Pacifica Radio station, KPFK-FM. His mother, Jane Gordon, ran for the United States Congress in California during the 1970s for the Peace and Freedom Party; she met Dennis Levitt while she was working as the program guide editor for KPFK-FM. Gordon-Levitt's maternal grandfather, Michael Gordon (1909–1993), was a Hollywood film director. Gordon-Levitt had an older brother, Dan, a photographer and fire spinner who died in 2010 at the age of 36. Gordon-Levitt attended Van Nuys High School and graduated in 1999.

Career

Early acting work

Gordon-Levitt joined a musical theater group at the age of four and played the Scarecrow in a production of The Wizard of Oz. Subsequently, he was approached by an agent and began appearing on television and in commercials for Sunny Jim peanut butter, Cocoa Puffs, Pop-Tarts, and Kinney Shoes.

At age six he starred in several made-for-television films. In 1991, he played both David Collins and Daniel Collins in the Dark Shadows television series and appeared in the movie A River Runs Through It . In the same year, he made an appearance as a boy who witnesses a murder in an episode of Quantum Leap.  During 1992–93, he played in The Powers That Be, a sitcom starring John Forsythe, as a clever young boy named Pierce Van Horne. Also in 1992, he portrayed Gregory Kingsley in the made-for-TV film Switching Parents, based on Kingsley's real life case of "divorcing" his parents. In 1994, he starred in the Disney film Angels in the Outfield as an orphan who sees angels. In 1996, he got the role of Tommy Solomon on the sitcom 3rd Rock from the Sun. The series ran for six seasons. The San Francisco Chronicle noted that Gordon-Levitt was a "Jewish kid playing an extraterrestrial pretending to be a Jewish kid". During the 1990s, he was frequently featured in teenage magazines. He also made an appearance on That '70s Show in 1998 as Buddy, a gay teenager who assumes his friend (main character Eric Forman) is gay as well, in the episode "Eric's Buddy".

Gordon-Levitt had a supporting role in 1998's Halloween H20: 20 Years Later, the 1999 film 10 Things I Hate About You, a modern-day adaptation of Shakespeare's The Taming of the Shrew, and voiced Jim Hawkins in Treasure Planet (2002), a Disney adaptation of the novel Treasure Island. In 2000, he began attending Columbia University. He studied history, literature, and French poetry. He became an avid Francophile and a French speaker. He also dated actress Julia Stiles and the two lived in John Jay Hall. He said that moving to New York City from his hometown forced him to grow as a person. He dropped out in 2004 to concentrate on acting again.

Later acting work
Gordon-Levitt has said that he made a conscious decision to "be in good movies" after returning to acting. His films include 2001's drama Manic which was set in a mental institution, Mysterious Skin (2004) in which he played a gay prostitute and child sexual abuse victim, and Brick (2005), a modern-day film noir set at a high school. In Brick he had the lead role of Brendan Frye, a teen who becomes involved in an underground drug ring while investigating a murder. Brick received positive reviews, with The Minnesota Dailys critic commenting that Gordon-Levitt played the character "beautifully", saying the performance was "true to (the) film's style", "unfeeling but not disenchanted", and "sexy in the most ambiguous way." Another review describes the performance as "astounding". He starred opposite Steve Sandvoss as a young judgmental missionary in Latter Days (2003), a film that centers on a sexually repressed Mormon missionary (Sandvoss) who falls for his gay neighbor. He also had roles in Havoc and Shadowboxer.

His next role was in 2007's The Lookout in which he played Chris Pratt, a janitor involved in a bank heist. In reviewing the film, The Philadelphia Inquirer described Gordon-Levitt as a "surprisingly formidable, and formidably surprising, leading man", while New York magazine stated that he is a "major tabula rasa actor ... a minimalist", and his character is effective because he "doesn't seize the space ... by what he takes away from the character." The San Francisco Chronicle specified that he "embodies, more than performs, a character's inner life." His 2008 and 2009 films include Stop-Loss, directed by Kimberly Peirce and revolving around American soldiers returning from the Iraq War, and Killshot in which he played a hoodlum partnered with a hired killer played by Mickey Rourke.

Gordon-Levitt played a lead role opposite to friend Zooey Deschanel in 500 Days of Summer, a well-received 2009 release about the deconstruction of a relationship. His performance, described as "the real key" to what makes the film work, credits him with using "his usual spell in subtle gradations." Varietys Todd McCarthy praised his performance, saying he "expressively alternates between enthusiasm and forlorn disappointment in the manner Jack Lemmon could". Peter Travers of Rolling Stone said the movie "hits you like a blast of pure romantic oxygen" and credited both lead actors for playing "it for real, with a grasp of subtlety and feeling that goes beyond the call of breezy duty." He was subsequently nominated for a Golden Globe Award.

He later played villain Cobra Commander in G.I. Joe: The Rise of Cobra. On November 21, 2009, he hosted Saturday Night Live. In 2010, he replaced James Franco and starred alongside Leonardo DiCaprio in Christopher Nolan's science fiction thriller Inception, which received favorable reviews.

In 2011, Gordon-Levitt began filming Christopher Nolan's The Dark Knight Rises in which he played John Blake, a police officer who emerges as a key ally of Batman. In Premium Rush, he played the starring role of a fixie-riding, brash bicycle messenger; he portrayed the younger version of Bruce Willis' character, in a shared role for the time-travel thriller Looper; and the supporting role of Robert Todd Lincoln in Steven Spielberg's biopic Lincoln. All three movies were released in 2012.

Gordon-Levitt played a new character, Johnny, in the sequel Sin City: A Dame to Kill For (2014), described by the filmmakers as "a cocky gambler who disguises a darker mission to destroy his most foul enemy at his best game". In October 2013, it was reported that he was one of the frontrunners to play Scott Lang / Ant-Man II for Marvel Studios' superhero film Ant-Man which eventually went to Paul Rudd.

In 2015, Gordon-Levitt starred as Philippe Petit in the biographical drama The Walk, directed by Academy Award-winning director Robert Zemeckis. Gordon-Levitt then played National Security Agency surveillance leaker Edward Snowden in Snowden, directed by Oliver Stone. The film was released in North America on September 16, 2016, and also starred Shailene Woodley, Melissa Leo, Zachary Quinto, Tom Wilkinson, and Nicolas Cage.

In 2017, Gordon-Levitt had a voice cameo in Star Wars: The Last Jedi. In 2019, Gordon-Levitt starred in 7500 directed by Patrick Vollrath, which had its world premiere at the Locarno Film Festival on August 9, 2019. It was released on June 19, 2020, by Amazon Studios. That same year, Gordon-Levitt had a voice cameo in Knives Out.

Gordon-Levitt starred in Project Power, directed by Ariel Schulman and Henry Joost, opposite Jamie Foxx and Dominique Fishback; it was released on August 14, 2020, by Netflix. He next played lawyer Richard Schultz in the drama film The Trial of the Chicago 7. The movie was written and directed by Aaron Sorkin; its release date was September 25, 2020. In March 2021, it was announced that Levitt would voice Jiminy Cricket in Robert Zemeckis' live-action film adaptation of Pinocchio. In 2022, he starred as Travis Kalanick, former CEO of Uber, in Showtime's anthology series Super Pumped, based on the bestselling book Super Pumped: The Battle for Uber by Mike Isaac.

Directing and producing
Gordon-Levitt's first film as director, the 24-minute-long Sparks was an adaptation of a short story by Elmore Leonard starring Carla Gugino and Eric Stoltz. Sparks was selected for the 2009 Sundance Film Festival to be shown as part of a new program for short films. In 2010, he directed another short film, Morgan and Destiny's Eleventeenth Date: The Zeppelin Zoo. It premiered at two houses during the South by Southwest festival in Austin.

He was one of the many producers of the Broadway show Slava's Snowshow.

In 2013, Gordon-Levitt wrote, directed, and starred in his screenwriting and directorial debut, Don Jon. The film also stars Scarlett Johansson, Julianne Moore, and Tony Danza and it premiered at the Sundance Film Festival in January 2013. Following the premiere, the film was acquired by Relativity Media and Gordon-Levitt stated: "I always intended this to be a movie for a mass popular audience. Everyone told me it was a long shot ... I couldn't possibly be more grateful."

In September 2019, it was announced Gordon-Levitt would write, direct, star, and executive produce Mr. Corman, a comedy-drama series produced by A24 for Apple TV+.

HitRecord

HitRecord (pronounced ; often stylized as hitREC●rd)

Gordon-Levitt created the platform in 2010 after a period of stagnation in his acting career. "I wanted to be creative, and no one was letting me [so I said] OK, I have to figure out something to do on my own." The company has $6.4 million in venture capital.

On 6 November 2020, Gordon-Levitt released Hong Kong Never Sleeps, a collaborative short film paying homage to Hong Kong created on hitRECord, on his Facebook page. It features photos and videos he collected from Hong Kongers since August 2020, which some themed around the Hong Kong protests starting in 2019, and voice by actors he recruited in October 2020.

Personal life
On October 4, 2010, Gordon-Levitt's older brother, Daniel Gordon-Levitt, was found dead in Hollywood, California, at the age of 36. According to the Los Angeles County Coroner's Office, Daniel’s cause of death was "ketamine intoxication, with the injury occurring by intake of overdose". Joseph Gordon-Levitt has publicly disputed the claim that his brother's death was caused by a drug overdose.

In October 2013, Gordon-Levitt identified himself as a feminist, giving credit to his mother: "My mom brought me up to be a feminist. She was active in the movement in the 1960s and 1970s. The Hollywood movie industry has come a long way since its past. It certainly has a bad history of sexism, but it ain't all the way yet."

In December 2014, Gordon-Levitt married Tasha McCauley, the founder and CEO of technology company Fellow Robots. Their first child, a son, was born in August 2015. Their second son was born in June 2017. He and McCauley do not want to reveal any details of their children to the media, including their first names. He has been living with his family in Wellington since October 2020, after moving his new TV production to New Zealand in response to the COVID-19 pandemic.

Gordon-Levitt has expressed support for the effective altruism movement. In 2017, he spoke at the Effective Altruism Global conference in San Francisco.

Filmography

Film

Television

Video games

Discography

Albums

Singles

Awards and nominations

References

External links

 
 
 

1981 births
Living people
20th-century American male actors
21st-century American male actors
American male child actors
American feminist writers
Male feminists
American male film actors
American male musical theatre actors
American male soap opera actors
American male television actors
American male screenwriters
American people of Romanian-Jewish descent
American people of Polish-Jewish descent
American people of Russian-Jewish descent
Columbia University School of General Studies alumni
Jewish American male actors
Jewish American writers
Jewish feminists
Male actors from Los Angeles
Outstanding Performance by a Cast in a Motion Picture Screen Actors Guild Award winners
People from Sherman Oaks, Los Angeles
Van Nuys High School alumni
Film directors from Los Angeles
Screenwriters from California
Feminist musicians
Primetime Emmy Award winners
21st-century American Jews
American expatriates in New Zealand
Disney people